Early Cyrillic numeral character Koppa (=90)

Koppa (Ҁ ҁ; italics: Ҁ ҁ) is an archaic numeral character of the Cyrillic script. Its form (and modern name) are derived from the Greek letter Koppa (Ϙ ϙ), but Half.

Koppa was used as a numeral character in the oldest Cyrillic manuscripts, representing the value 90 (exactly as its Greek ancestor did). It was replaced relatively early around 1300 by the Cyrillic letter Che (Ч ч), which is similar in appearance and originally had no numeric value.  Isolated examples of Ч used as a numeral are found in the East and South Slavonic areas as early as the eleventh century, though Koppa continued in regular use into the fourteenth century.  In some varieties of Western Cyrillic, however, Koppa was retained, and Ч used with the value 60, replacing the Cyrillic letter Ksi (Ѯ ѯ).

Cyrillic Koppa never had a phonetic value and was never used as a letter by any national language using Cyrillic. However, certain modern textbooks and dictionaries of Old Church Slavonic language insert this character among other letters of the early Cyrillic alphabet, either between П and Р (to reproduce the Greek alphabetical order) or at the very end of the list.

Computing codes

See also
 Q q : Latin letter Q
 Қ қ : Cyrillic letter ka with descender, used in Turkic languages and Tajik to transcribe the voiceless uvular plosive (/q/)
 Ӄ ӄ : Cyrillic letter ka with hook, used in languages in the Russian Far East to transcribe the voiceless uvular plosive (/q/)

Further reading
 Старославянский словарь (по рукописям X—XI веков), под редакцией Р. М. Цейтлин, Р. Вечерки и Э. Благовой, Москва, “Русский язык”, 1994,  (an Old Slavonic dictionary compiled by manuscripts of 10-11 c.).
 Lunt, Horace G. Old Church Slavonic grammar. Berlin, New York: Mouton de Gruyter, 2001 (7th ed.), .

References